Seuth Khampa (born 8 September 1962) is a Laotian sprinter. She competed in the women's 100 metres at the 1980 Summer Olympics. She was the first woman to represent Laos at the Olympics.

References

External links
 

1962 births
Living people
Athletes (track and field) at the 1980 Summer Olympics
Laotian female sprinters
Olympic athletes of Laos
Place of birth missing (living people)
Olympic female sprinters